Ambrogio Santapau was a 16th-century Sicilian nobleman. Originally, marquis of Licodia, a title he inherited from his father Porzio, in 1563 King Philip II of Spain granted him the first title of a prince in Sicily as prince of Butera. He had loyally served the royal interests in Sicily as maestro giustiziere, Captain General, and President of Sicily (1546-1548). He was inducted into the Order of the Golden Fleece in 1548. As stratigotus of Messina, he vigorously defended Torre Faro against a pillaging expedition by Hayreddin Barbarossa. He had no offspring and was succeeded by his brother Francesco Santapau.

It is likely the Santapau family descended from the branch that included the Catalan admiral Ponce or Ponzio de Santapau.

References

Date of birth unknown
Date of death unknown
Sicilian nobility
16th-century Sicilian people